Dumraon Assembly constituency is one of 243 constituencies of legislative assembly of Bihar. It comes under Buxar Lok Sabha constituency. In 2020 Ajit Kushwaha of CPI(ML) won from the Dumraon constituency.

Overview
Dumraon comprises Community Blocks of Chaugain, Kesath & Nawanagar; Gram Panchayats of Chilhari, Kushalpur, Bhojpur Kadim, Bhojpur Jadid, Chhatanwar, Nuaon, Sowan, Ariaon, Nandan, Lakhan Dihra & Dumraon (M) of Dumraon CD Block.

Members of Legislative Assembly

Election results

2020

See also
 List of Assembly constituencies of Bihar

References

External links
 

Politics of Buxar district
Assembly constituencies of Bihar